The Cocom or Cocomes were a Maya family or dynasty who controlled the Yucatán Peninsula in the late Postclassic period. Their capital was at Mayapan. The dynasty was founded by Hunac Ceel, and was overthrown sometime between 1440 and 1441 by Ah Xupan of the Xiu lineage.

References

Mayan chiefdoms of the Yucatán Peninsula
1440s disestablishments in North America
15th-century disestablishments in the Maya civilization